The career jumps and stunts of motorcycle daredevil Evel Knievel spanned from 1965 to 1980.
As a professional daredevil, Knievel attempted or successfully jumped over 75 ramp-to-ramp motorcycle jumps, as well as his failed 1974 X-2 Skycycle rocket jump.  The majority of his jumps were made on the Harley-Davidson XR-750 motorcycle.

References

United States sport-related lists